The Brunswick Shopping Centre, with over 30 shops, is in the centre of Scarborough, North Yorkshire, England. It was built on the site of a former Debenhams store, which was an anchor tenant until its closure in May 2021. It has an annual footfall of approximately 7 million people.

Architecture
The design for the building, including its bow front, is influenced by the period architecture of Scarborough. The Brunswick Centre is a modern enclosed two-level building with a Debenhams store, Argos, New Look, and 28 other shops.

Bathing Belle statue
In 2002 Scarborough Civic Society commissioned Sunderland artist, Craig Knowles, to create two sculptures for the town at a cost of £40,000. One of these, The Bathing Belle, was installed on a plinth outside the centre in April 2008. The cost of the statue was met through a mixture of grants, donations from businesses and private subscriptions.

2017 sale
On 4 April 2017 it was announced that M&G Real Estate were putting the freehold lease up for sale, after over two decades of ownership. The lease was priced at £31.75 million, listed through Knight Frank.

References

External links
Brunswick Shopping Centre official website

Buildings and structures completed in 1990
Buildings and structures in Scarborough, North Yorkshire
Shopping malls established in 1990
Shopping centres in North Yorkshire